Chamaeleon (or Chameleon; ; c. 350 – c. 275 BC), was a Peripatetic philosopher of Heraclea Pontica. He was one of the immediate disciples of Aristotle. He wrote works on several of the ancient Greek poets, namely:

περὶ Ἀνακρέοντος - On Anacreon
περὶ Σαπφοῦς - On Sappho
περὶ Σιμωνίδου - On Simonides
περὶ Θεσπίδος - On Thespis
περὶ Αἰσχύλου - On Aeschylus
περὶ Λάσου - On Lasus
περὶ Πινδάρου - On Pindar
περὶ Στησιχόρου - On Stesichorus

He also wrote on the Iliad, and on Comedy (περὶ κωμῳδίας). In this last work he treated, among other subjects, of the dances of comedy. This work is quoted by Athenaeus by the title περὶ τῆς ἀρχαίας κωμῳδίας, which is also the title of a work by the Peripatetic philosopher Eumelus.  It would seem also that he wrote on Hesiod, for Diogenes Laërtius says, that Chamaeleon accused Heraclides Ponticus of having stolen from him his work concerning Homer and Hesiod. The above works were probably both biographical and critical. He also wrote works entitled περὶ θεῶν, and περὶ σατύρων, and some moral treatises, περι ἡδονῆς (which was also ascribed to Theophrastus), προτρεπικόν, and περι μέθης (on Drunkenness). Of all his works only a few fragments are preserved by Athenaeus and other ancient writers.

Notes

References
 Martano, A., Matelli, E., Mirhady, D. (eds.), Praxiphanes of Mytilene and Chamaeleon of Eraclea, New Brunswick: Transaction Publishers, 2012 (RUSCH XVIII).

3rd-century BC Greek people
4th-century BC writers
4th-century BC philosophers
4th-century BC births
3rd-century BC deaths
Ancient Greek writers
Ancient Pontic Greeks
Hellenistic-era philosophers from Anatolia
People from Bithynia
Peripatetic philosophers